The 1935 Appalachian State Mountaineers football team was an American football team that represented Appalachian State Teachers College (now known as Appalachian State University) as a member of the North State Conference and the Smoky Mountain Conference during the 1935 college football season. In their first year under head coach Kidd Brewer, the Mountaineers compiled an overall record of 5–2–2, with a mark of 1–0–1 in NSC and 3–2 in SMC conference play.

Schedule

References

Appalachian State
Appalachian State
Appalachian State Mountaineers football seasons
Appalachian State Mountaineers football